The Frasne–Les Verrières railway is a railway line in the Franche-Comté region of France. It runs  from the Franco–Swiss border at Verrières-de-Joux to Frasne. It was built between 1860–1862 by the Chemins de fer de Paris à Lyon et à la Méditerranée and is now owned by SNCF.

Services 

References

External links 
 

Railway lines in Bourgogne-Franche-Comté
Railway lines opened in 1860
1860 establishments in France
25 kV AC railway electrification
15 kV AC railway electrification